Northwest Airlines Flight 5 may refer to:
Northwest Airlines Flight 5 (1990), where the aircraft operating the flight suffered loss of an engine and landed safely in Florida on January 4, 1990
Northwest Airlines Flight 5 (1941), where the aircraft operating the flight experienced severe icing and crashed in Minnesota on October 30, 1941

Flight number disambiguation pages